South Forsyth High School is a public high school, built in 1989, located in Cumming, Georgia, a suburb northeast of Atlanta. It is one of eight public high schools in the Forsyth County School District, and serves students who live in parts of unincorporated Cumming. In 2017, South Forsyth High School was ranked #416 on US News "Best High Schools Ranking". The school has been given an "A" rating and Platinum status by the Governor's Office of Student Achievement for more than five years. South Forsyth High School has offered the International Baccalaureate Diploma Programme and the Career-Related Programme since 2000 and 2012, respectively.

History
South Forsyth High School first opened in 1989 as both a middle and high school, named South Forsyth Junior High. An additional building, East Hall, was later added to allow the high school and middle school to operate separately. In 1998, a new middle school, South Forsyth Middle School, was built on a separate property, allowing the high school to utilize the entire campus. After this, students were moved from Forsyth County High, now Forsyth Central High School, to alleviate overcrowding. Eventually South Forsyth High School experienced its own overcrowding, which prompted the construction and opening of West Forsyth High School in 2007, Lambert High School in 2009, and Denmark High School in 2018.

Renovations
As a result of district-wide overcrowding at all of the middle schools, such as Lakeside Middle School, Piney Grove Middle School, and South Forsyth Middle School, a $195 million bond referendum was passed, which included significant improvements to South Forsyth High School. These included a new cafeteria, a new 42,000 square foot competition gym, improved traffic flow, a new administration center, 23 new classrooms, a new front façade, and a new courtyard in front of East Hall featuring walkways to connect the several separate buildings on campus. The renovations were designed by Manley Spangler Smith Architects. Balfour Beatty was selected as the construction manager, with a maximum of $25.7 million budgeted for the project. In July 2016, the new additions were opened to the public. The new additions include administrative offices, nine new classrooms, a large dining hall, a competition style gym, and the South Forsyth Plaza.

1990 hostage stand-off 
On September 7, 1990, Randy Floyd Addis entered the school with a rifle, a shotgun and a semi-automatic pistol.  After a teacher wrestled the rifle away from him, he used the pistol to hold many of his classmates hostage.  Most of the students were released over the course of the morning.  In the early afternoon, Floyd became dizzy and gave himself up, releasing the final nine children. No one was injured.

Athletics
South Forsyth currently competes in Region 6-AAAAAAA (Area 3 AAAAAAA for lacrosse),← and has since 2012. SFHS has seven varsity sports for boys and girls. The school fields junior varsity teams for most sports and freshmen teams in football and volleyball. The school is a member of the Georgia High School Association. South Forsyth is currently the region champion in football for Region 6-AAAAAA.

In 2015, the varsity football team finished with a school high 11-2 record, beating rival school Lambert by a long shot, winning the Region 6-AAAAAA Championship and making it to the quarterfinals of the GHSA Playoffs until ultimately losing to Colquitt County High School.

The school has won state championships in competition cheerleading in 1997 and 1999, girls' cross country in 2016, boys’ cross country 2018, and Men's Quartet in 2009.

Other studies 
South Forsyth High School offers a fairly wide selection of Advanced Placement (AP), and International Baccalaureate (IB) accredited classes. South Forsyth is currently the only school in the Forsyth County School District to offer the IB program. South Forsyth also offers other study alternatives, including Work Based Learning and Dual Enrollment. The former allows students to work during part of the day for the variety of companies, while the latter allows students to take college classes for both college and high school credit at either the Lanier Technical College, University of North Georgia (UNG), or Georgia Institute of Technology. Through the Move On When Ready program, some students take all their classes at a college (typically UNG) and never come to South Forsyth's campus, save for the occasional counselor visit.

Additionally, the school offers Distance Learning (DL) courses in association with the Georgia Institute of Technology in courses such as Genetics, Linear Algebra or Multivariable Calculus for students who have met the necessary requirements.

Clubs and organizations 
South Forsyth offers a multitude of student clubs and organizations in addition to athletics. These include Science Olympiad, FBLA, Academic Bowl, HOSA, MDJunior, TSA, FCA, Drama, Debate, Band, and DECA.

FBLA 

FBLA is the co-curricular student organization for Business and Computer Science students but is open to all students that wish to join. FBLA allows students to gain leadership skills by participating in chapter events (fundraisers, membership drives, community service), working on chapter teams (website management, promotion), becoming a chapter/region/state level officer, and competing in business and computer science events. Students in the Programming & Computer Science Pathway and the Entrepreneurship & Human Resource Management Pathway learn about and participate in FBLA activities in class. FBLA is the largest and oldest business student organization in the world.
South Forsyth FBLA is one of the largest FBLA chapters in the world and has been the Georgia FBLA Chapter of Year for two years in a row (2016–17,2017–18). The chapter currently has over 400+ members and is one of the biggest student organizations on campus.
https://www.southforsythfbla.com/about.html

DECA 

South Forsyth is home to the "World's second Largest DECA Chapter" and "Georgia's Largest DECA Chapter." The chapter was started in 1999 and has since grown to almost 1,500 members. In DECA, students can compete against other students from around the world in fields such as business, marketing, finance, and hospitality.

TSA and Robotics 

South Forsyth created a Technology Student Association (TSA) chapter in 2010. With the exception of the first year, South Forsyth has ranked in the top 10 statewide every year. In 2011 they were ranked 7th, from 2012-2015 they were ranked 3rd, in 2016 they were ranked 2nd, and in 2017 they were ranked 1st in the state, overtaking the previous state champion Parkview. TSA host over 70 competitive events, including website design, dragster design, engineering, biotechnology, fashion design, and coding.

In addition to TSA, South Forsyth boast a wide variety of robotics, including Vex Robotics (Team 1961), BEST Robotics (Team 119), and FIRST Robotics (Team 4112). South Forsyth has consistently seen performance among the best in the state at all types of robotics, including several state championship and even ranking third in the world at the 2014 Vex World Championship with team 1961C, the number which was thusly retired. South Forsyth commonly competes with the name "Eaglebots" across all types of robotics. In 2017 Vex Competition season, South Forsyth had the highest scoring season in TSA history gaining a total of 22 trophies in the one-year period, more than all the other years combined.

Student data  
Students are drawn from Piney Grove Middle School, Lakeside Middle School, and South Forsyth Middle School. South currently serves students in grades 9-12. Students can also ask to transfer to South from other schools in order to participate in the competitive IB program.

Demographics 
During the 2021-22 school year, South Forsyth had an enrollment of 2,352 students. The student body was 49.9% White, 36.6% Asian, 6.8% Hispanic, 2.6% Black, 3.6% Multiracial, 0.3% Native American, and 0.1% Pacific Islander.

Notable alumni 
Ellison Barber: American journalist, NBC News (formerly with WUSA9 and Fox News Channel)
Zac Brown: founder and leader of the Grammy-award-winning Zac Brown Band
Jalen Camp: NFL wide receiver
Marjorie Taylor Greene: Congresswoman from Georgia's 14th congressional district
Billy Magnussen: Tony nominated actor
Ryann Redmond: actress and singer
Chris Rowley: MLB pitcher
Landon Sims: MLB draftee.

References

External links 
 South Forsyth High School's homepage

Public high schools in Georgia (U.S. state)
Schools in Forsyth County, Georgia